Chen Chien-nien (born 10 October 1947) is a former Taiwanese politician. Born in Taitung, Chen entered politics in 1981 as a Taitung councillor representing the Chinese Nationalist Party (KMT). He served as County Magistrate of Taitung from 1993 to 2001. A member of the Puyuma tribe, he is the only indigenous politician to have served as a county magistrate in Taiwan. In 2002, Chen quit the KMT to accept the cabinet-level Minister of Council of Aboriginal Affairs post in Chen Shui-bian's Democratic Progressive Party (DPP) administration.  He resigned in 2005 due to a vote-buying charge, whilst continuing to maintain his innocence. Following a failed appeal to the Supreme Court in 2012, he was sentenced to nine months in jail.

References

1947 births
Living people
20th-century Taiwanese politicians
21st-century Taiwanese politicians
Puyuma people
Magistrates of Taitung County
Kuomintang politicians in Taiwan
Government ministers of Taiwan
Taiwanese politicians of indigenous descent
Taiwanese politicians convicted of fraud